Saltinho is a municipality in the state of São Paulo in Brazil. The population is 8,393 (2020 est.) in an area of 99.7 km². The elevation is 595 m.

References

Municipalities in São Paulo (state)